Arslanovo (Arıślan) is a rural locality (a selo) in Arslanovsky Selsoviet, Buzdyaksky District, Bashkortostan, Russia. The population was 482 as of 2010. There are 4 streets.

Geography 
Arslanovo is located 21 km northwest of Buzdyak (the district's administrative centre) by road. Starye Bogady is the nearest rural locality.

References 

Rural localities in Buzdyaksky District